Chromosome 11 open reading frame 54 (C11orf54) is a protein that in humans is encoded by the C11orf54 gene. The "Homo sapiens" gene, C11orf54 is also known as PTD012 and PTOD12. C11orf54 exhibits hydrolase activity on p-nitrophenyl acetate and acts on ester bonds, though the overall function is still not fully understood by the scientific community. The protein is highly conserved with the most distant homolog found is in bacteria.

Gene
C11orf54 is located on chromosome 11 at 11q21. Common aliases of the gene are PTD012 and PT0D12. The gene consists 13 exons and spans 23730 bp. C11orf54 is flanked by TAF1D and MED17.

mRNA
The protein ester hydrolase c11orf54 exists as a monomer and is composed of 315 amino acids. There are 6 isoforms for C11orf54. See table 1.
 

The amino acid sequence contains the domain of unknown function 1907. Found in this transcript is the HxHxxxxxxxxxH motif which coordinates the zinc ion involved in the hydrolase activity. An LR nest motif is found at lys262 and Arg263. The LR nest motif forms hydrogen bonds between the NH groups and anions; an acetate anion is coordinated with the LR nest.

Protein

Primary sequence
Table 2 shows the different characteristics of the protein sequence throughout humans and other orthologs.

Secondary structure
The protein of C11orf54 exists as a monomer in solution. The protein assumes a globular shape of 20 beta strands and 4 alpha helices, containing 9 antiparallel beta strands forming a beta screw region. The β-screw region of C11orf54 has structural similarity to the cyclic adenosine 3′,5′-monophosphate (cAMP) binding domain of the regulatory subunit of protein kinase A. A zinc ion is bound to the HxHxxxxxxxxxH motif found in the sequence.

Subcellular localization
C11orf54 is predicted to be localized 60.9% in the cytoplasm, 21.7% in the nucleus, 13.0% mitochondrial and 4.3% in the Golgi Apparatus.

Expression & post translational modifications

 See image one. The protein is highly expressed in the kidneys and moderately expressed in the adrenal gland, colon, liver, testis and thyroid gland.

Homology

Paralogs
There are no paralogs for C11orf54.

Orthologs
The protein Ester Hydrolase C11orf54 has many orthologs (see table.) It is highly conserved (60-100% identity) in mammals, reptiles, birds, and fish. The protein is moderately conserved (30-59.99% identity) in invertebrates, amphibia, Cnidaria, Mollusca, fungi and bacteria. It is not conserved in archaea. The most distant orthologs are bacteria. Figure 2 shows the unrooted phylogenetic tree of a few of C11orf54’s orthologs.

Function
C11orf54's coordination with a zinc ion through three histidines and an acetate anion is likely to point to a function of the protein being an enzymatic reaction as an ester hydrolase. The protein has a high turnover number when reacted with p-nitrophenyl acetate (0.042 sec−1) as compared to a 1 sec−1 turnover rate found in another enzyme (bovine carbonic anhydrase II) that reacts with  p-nitrophenyl acetate.

Interacting Proteins

References

Further reading

External links